Anoplocephala is a genus of tapeworms in the family Anoplocephalidae named in 1848 by Émile Blanchard. The type species is Anoplocephala perfoliata, which was originally described as Taenia perfoliata. Anoplocephala is a cestode, belonging to the Cestoda class, meaning that it is a Flatworm parasite. They can be found in fifty-six percent of the wild rhino population in Assam, India.

References

External links

Cestoda genera